D. Luís da Cunha (25 January 1662 in Lisbon – 9 October 1749 in Paris) was a Portuguese diplomat who served under D. João V of Portugal as part of His Most Faithful Majesty's Council. He was also Judge of the Royal Household, Envoy Extraordinary of Portuguese Cortes to London, Madrid and Paris, and Minister Plenipotentiary to the Congress of Utrecht, as well as part of the Portuguese Royal Academy of History.

D. Luis da Cunha was considered an "Estrangeirado", a Portuguese that has been influenced greatly by foreign ideas. He was a critic of the Inquisition and the persecution of New Christians.

Early life 
D. Luís da Cunha was born on 25 January 1662, in Lisbon, to D. António Álvares da Cunha, 18th Lord of Tábua, head of the House of Cunha and a member of the Forty Conspirators, and Maria Manoel de Vilhena, daughter of Cristóvão Manoel de Vilhena.

He studied law at the University of Coimbra, after which he was appointed as Judge to the Relation of Porto, and later to Royal Household the Lisbon.

Career 

In 1696, he was appointed envoy extraordinary to London, where he participated in important negotiations related to the Portuguese intervention in the War of Spanish Succession, the most complex political event of the time. In 1712, along with the Count of Tarouca, he represented Portuguese interests in the Congress of Utrecht.

After the signing of the Treaty of Utecht, 1715, he returned to London as envoy extraordinary, by request of the newly crowned King George I of Great Britain.

Then he was sent to Madrid, then ruled by Giulio Alberoni, with whom he had several disputes.

Subsequently, he was appointed Minister Plenipotentiary to the Congress of Cambray, which ended up not taking place. Cunha remained in Paris, where he was forced to retire due to a disagreement with Ambassador Livry, envoy of France to Lisbon. Cunha went to Brussels, where he reached an agreement with the Marquis of Fenelon, French minister to The Hague, and returned to Paris, where he remained as envoy extraordinary of Portugal to the French court, until his death.

Ideas 
D. Luís da Cunha had early ideas of pluricontinentalism, proposing the idea of moving the capital of the Portuguese monarchy from metropolitan Portugal to Brazil. By establishing himself in  the "immense continent of Brazil", the King of Portugal would take the title of "Emperor of the Occident."

This idea was already presented by Father António Vieira, during the emergency period of the Portuguese Restoration War, but was reiterated by Dom Luís da Cunha when no imminent threat hung over Portuguese sovereignty.

The idea was proposed as a means of affirmation and advancement of the Kingdom of Portugal, while at the same time guaranteeing its security from European powers.

Distinctions
  Knight Commander of the Order of Christ

References

External links 

GeneAll: Luís da Cunha

Portuguese nobility
Political office-holders in Portugal
People from Lisbon
University of Coimbra alumni
18th-century Portuguese people
Ambassadors of Portugal to the United Kingdom
Ambassadors of Portugal to France
Ambassadors of Portugal to Spain
1662 births
1749 deaths